The 2022 Honda Indy 200 was the ninth round of the 2022 IndyCar season. The race was held on July 3, 2022, in Lexington, Ohio at the Mid-Ohio Sports Car Course. The race consisted of 80 laps and was won by Scott McLaughlin.

Entry list

Practice

Practice 1

Practice 2

Qualifying

Qualifying classification 

 Notes
 Bold text indicates fastest time set in session.

Warmup

Race 
The race started at 12:53 PM ET on July 3, 2022.

Race classification

Championship standings after the race 

Drivers' Championship standings

Engine manufacturer standings

 Note: Only the top five positions are included.

References

Indy 200 at Mid-Ohio
Honda Indy 200
Honda Indy 200
Honda Indy 200